The Calhoun Depot was a railway station of the Western & Atlantic Railroad that was built by the State of Georgia during 1852–53 in Calhoun, Georgia.  Unusual for railroads, the Western & Atlantic Railroad was owned and operated by a U.S. state.  Calhoun is on its route built from Atlanta, Georgia to Chattanooga, Tennessee.  Like other brick or stone depots on the line, the Calhoun Depot was involved in but survived the American Civil War.  It was part of the Great Locomotive Chase.

It was listed on the NRHP in 1982.  It was deemed significant architecturally "because it represents an antebellum depot designed and built to serve its essential functions. Its simple lines and fundamental, utilitarian styling exemplifies the early, unpretentious frontier times of North Georgia in which it was created." The depot was also deemed significant in transportation history "because it symbolizes the effect the arrival of the railroad had on the area."

The town of Calhoun, which grew from a settlement known as Oothcalooga, is in area that was taken from the Cherokee Nation in the 1830s.  Its location was in Cass County and then Bartow County.  At some point it became a railroad stop and finally in 1850 it became the first county seat of new Gordon County.  Oothcalooga was soon renamed to Calhoun.

According to its NRHP nomination, "The selection of the site for a railroad stop was a prime factor in its later becoming the county seat. The railroad served as a major travel artery, as well as a supply line during the Civil War. It was also part of one of the war's most famous events, during the Great Locomotive Chase."

After 1890, the State-owned W & A Line was leased to the L & N Railroad.  The last passenger train making stops in Calhoun was the L&N's Dixie Flyer, which made its last stop there in 1965.  As of 1982, freight service continued on the line.

References

National Register of Historic Places in Gordon County, Georgia
Railway stations in the United States opened in 1852
Former Louisville and Nashville Railroad stations
1852 establishments in Georgia (U.S. state)
Railway stations on the National Register of Historic Places in Georgia (U.S. state)
Former railway stations in Georgia (U.S. state)